A professional handler, sometimes called a professional dog handler is a person who trains, conditions and shows dogs in conformation shows for a fee. Handlers are hired by dog owners or breeders to finish their championship, or if finished, to show in the Best of Breed class as a "special".

Education
Becoming a professional handler does not require any formal schooling, but an apprenticeship under an established handler and an adherence to a code of ethics is sometimes required in order to join into one of the professional organizations.

External links
PHA, Professional Handler's Association
Dog Handlers' Guild
AKC's Registered Handlers Program
Canadian Professional Handlers Association

Dog training and behavior
Dog shows and showing
Dog-related professions and professionals